The 1982 Nevada gubernatorial election took place on November 2, 1982 to elect the Governor of Nevada. Incumbent Republican Robert List ran unsuccessfully for re-election to a second term. He lost to Democratic nominee Richard Bryan by a small margin.

This was the most recent election in which Nevada's incumbent governor lost re-election until Democrat Steve Sisolak's defeat in 2022.

Democratic primary

Candidates
 Richard Bryan, state attorney general
 Myron E. Leavitt, incumbent Lieutenant Governor of Nevada
 Stan Colton, state treasurer
 June Carr
 Cher Volin
 Carl Hunt

Results

Republican primary

Candidates
Robert List, incumbent Governor of Nevada
Michael Moody, U.S. Army veteran
Edward E. "Ned" Eyre Jr.

Results

General election

Candidates
Richard Bryan (D), state attorney general
Robert List (R), incumbent Governor of Nevada
Dan Becan (L)

Results

References

1982
Nevada
Gubernatorial